Desingu Raja is a 2013 Indian Tamil-language comedy film directed by Ezhil, and produced by P. Madan under the banner Escape Artists Motion Pictures. Starring Vimal and Bindu Madhavi, it also features Soori, Singampuli and Ravi Mariya, playing supporting roles. The film is set in two villages which are perpetually at conflict with one another.

The film had been extensively shot in Thanjavur, Kumbakonam and Chennai. The music is scored by D. Imman, while Sooraj Nallusami, and Gopi Krishna were the cinematographer and editor respectively. The film was released on 23 August 2013, to favourable reviews and become a hit especially in B and C theaters.

Plot
Idhayakani (Vimal), who hails from the village Killiyoor, is a firm believer in nonviolence. The ongoing feud between his family and the family of Cheena Thaana (Gnanavel) from the neighboring village of Puliyoor is a source of constant worry for him. Though their rivalry began on a minor issue, many lives were sacrificed over the years. Idhayakani's father (Aadukalam Naren) is killed by Cheena Thaana. Angered by his son's death, Idhayakani's grandfather (Vinu Chakravarthy) retaliates by killing Cheena Thaana's son. Cheena Thaana vows to kill Idhayakani.

Meanwhile, Idhayakani meets Cheena Thaana's daughter Thamarai (Bindu Madhavi) at a temple festival and falls deeply in love with her. Chaos ensues when both realize who their families are, and the respective sets of parents and villagers object to their romance. Idhayakani marries Thamarai at a temple, and Cheena Thaana gets killed by Idhayakani's grandfather's henchmen. Thus, Thamarai develops hatred towards Idhayakani for her father's death. According to Panchayat, Thamarai goes to Idhayakani's home with her family in order to kill Idhayakani, but they fail in their attempts. When Chitappa (Ravi Mariya) hears that Thamarai is pregnant, he is determine to kill her child, but Thamarai's uncle Surya (Soori) tries to give strength tonic instead of poison to Thamarai, which makes her safe. In the climax, Killiooru organizes a Kabaddi match in Puliooru. Chitappa arrives at the place by kidnapping Thamarai and her mother (Vanitha Krishnachandran), but Idhayakani's uncle Koushik (Singampuli) was kidnapped instead of Thamarai. It turns out that Surya had saved her. Chitappa arrives to kill Idhayakani, but the presence of cheerleaders makes him undergo a change of heart. He then dances to the tune of Gangnam Style and accepts Idhayakani wholeheartedly.

Cast

 Vimal as Idhayakani
 Bindu Madhavi as Thamarai, Cheena Thaana's daughter
 Soori as Suriya, Thamarai's uncle
 Singampuli as Koushik, Idhayakani's uncle
 Ravi Mariya as Chitappa
 Gnanavel as Cheena Thaana, Thamarai's father
 Aadukalam Naren as Idhayakani's father
 Vinu Chakravarthy as Idhayakani's grandfather
 Vanitha Krishnachandran as Thamarai's mother
 Chaams as Idhayakani's friend
 Singamuthu as Idhayakani's friend
 Charle
 Vadivukkarasi
 Suzane George
 Muktha Bhanu : special appearance in song "Nelavattam"
 Vennira Aadai Moorthy : special appearance in song "Pom Pom"
 Swaminathan : special appearance in song "Pom Pom"

Production
After a fairly successful outing with Manam Kothi Paravai, director Ezhil started his next titled Desingu Raja, which was in a similar genre rural comedy. He roped in Vimal to play the lead Idhayakani, who has been named so by his parents and is a diehard MGR fan. Bindu Madhavi was signed to play the female lead as a Rajini fanatic in the movie, thus pairing with Vimal for second time after Kedi Billa Killadi Ranga. She said "I play a cheerful, naughty village girl". Muktha Bhanu danced for one song along with Vimal and the group dancers which was shot in Thiruvarur.

Sify reported that the film was nearly 50% complete in December 2012. In April 2013 a song sequence featuring Vimal and Bindu Madhavi was shot for almost ten days in a set worth 15 lakhs. In May 2013 the crew shot a song sequence for 10 days with Vimal and Bindu Madhavi in a set resembling a fruit godown.

Soundtrack

The soundtrack album for Desingu Raja is composed by D. Imman, in his second collaboration with Ezhil after Manam Kothi Paravai, and his first collaboration with Vimal. The album contains five songs, which was written by Yugabharathi, and five karaoke versions of the songs, however in the film, four songs were used; The song "Yaarume Kekkave Illa" was not included in the film. The track "Ammadi Ammadi" was released as a single on 17 June 2013, via the composer's SoundCloud channel. The audio was released, along with the albums of Varuthapadatha Valibar Sangam and Thanga Meenkal on 19 July 2013, at Sathyam Cinemas in Chennai.

The audio songs were ranked at the 19th position in "Top 25 Albums of 2013" by Behindwoods, and the song "Ammadi Ammadi" sung by Shreya Ghoshal, received positive response from audiences, topping all the FM Radio charts upon release. Behindwoods rated the album 2.75 out of 5, stating "The album is folksy and well produced." S. R. Ashok Kumar of The Hindu, gave a positive review stating "The music is mixed with a liberal dose of comedy." Milliblog reviewed the album stating "Imman-Ezhil’s combo’s signature style is evident and thoroughly enjoyable!" Therarefied gave a verdict stating "Imman continues his golden run with Desingu Raja."

Track listing

Release
The film was originally slated to release on 9 August 2013, but due to the release of Vijay-starrer Thalaivaa, it got postponed to 15 August 2013, and again postponed, due to the controversies of the release of Thalaivaa. The film's distribution rights were acquired by Olympia Movies. The film released on 23 August 2013 in 300 screens across Tamil Nadu.

Marketing 
A musical teaser from the film was released on 9 June 2013. Another musical teaser from the film was released on composer Imman's SoundCloud channel on 15 June 2013. Two trailers from the film were released, with one of them during the audio launch on 19 July 2013, and the another trailer was unveiled on 3 August 2013.

Reception
The film opened to positive reviews from critics. Rediff gave it a 2.5 out of 5 and stated, "The unconvincing storyline may not hold your attention, also some unfunny comic elements in the film will not certainly keep you entertained throughout." Behindwoods gave it a 1.5 out of 5 and wrote, "On the whole, Desingu Raja doesn’t have much going for it as this blend of comedy, romance and family drama is one that has been done to death many times." Deccan Herald also gave the same rating and wrote: "It's an unambitious film on a mission to entertain its viewers with full-length comedy. Honestly, it doesn't succeed in its mission because the forced humour does not even works for a few minutes, but after a while it really tests your patience." The Times of India gave it a 2.5 out of 5 and stated "You will not like this film if you are looking for a rural comedy that feels fresh and funny." The Hindu wrote "Desingu Raja is about the union of a couple from feuding villages, but it’s really a cautionary tale about making movies with no jokes and no script."

References

External links
 

2013 films
2010s Tamil-language films
Indian comedy films
Films directed by Ezhil